The Thursday Morning Club, or TMC, is a non-profit, social and philanthropic organization founded in 1896 in Madison, New Jersey and provides childcare services, assistance programs for women, and provides low-cost event venue space for other non-profits in Madison, New Jersey and its surrounding communities. Their stated mission is "...providing programs and projects" promoting "...women’s health, preserving natural resources, promoting literacy and equality, and ... volunteer service".

History 

 1896 – Thursday Morning Club founded
 1900 – TMC became a member of the New Jersey State Federation of Women's Clubs (NJSFWC)
 1907 – TMC became a member of the General Federation of Women's Clubs (GFWC)
 1924 – Settlement House, now known as the Madison Community House, constructed at 25 Cook Avenue
 1927 – TMC acquires non-profit status
 1938 – Madison Friends of the Library formed – now independent organization
 1950 – Rose Wing added to the Settlement House
 1957 – Settlement House becomes the Madison Community House
 1960 – Madison Community House Nursery School opened
 1966 – Rose Wing added and Youth Employment Services offered
 1967 – Branch of Morris County Legal Aid Society operated from MCH
 1995 – Association with Morris County Probation Dept. and Project Community Pride
 1998 – Dress for Success relocated to Madison Community House
 2000 – Before and After School Child Care Program begins in Madison Public Schools
 2001 – TMC purchases land at 27 Cook Avenue to build a playground and parking lot

References 

1896 establishments in New Jersey
Madison, New Jersey
Organizations established in 1896